Oswald Hope Robertson (2 June 1886 – 23 March 1966) was an English-born medical scientist who pioneered the idea of blood banks in the "blood depots" he established in 1917 during service in France with the US Army Medical Corps.


Life 

Robertson was born on 2 June 1886 in Woolwich in south-east London, but at the age of one-and-a-half he emigrated with his parents to California, settling in the San Joaquin Valley. He attended local schools in Dinuba, then graduated from the Polytechnic High School in San Francisco.

His initial plan to study basic biology was changed by a meeting with an American medical student while on holiday in Germany. After attending some lectures on anatomy, he decided to study medicine, being admitted to the University of California in 1906. He later studied at Harvard Medical School, the Massachusetts General Hospital and the Rockefeller Institute for Medical Research, but had to cut short his studies during World War I when he was called to join medical teams in France. Here he experimented with preserving human blood cells for use in blood transfusions, and became recognised as the inventor of the blood bank.

After World War I, he accepted an associate professorship at the Peking Union Medical College in Beijing, China. He became a Full Professor at the institution in 1923. In 1927 he returned to USA, and accepted a position as head of the Department of Medicine at the University of Chicago.

He remained at Chicago until retiring to emeritus status in 1951.

After retiring, Robertson moved to California. He died in Santa Cruz on 23 March 1966.

Commemoration
 Robertson Blood Center, Fort Hood TX

References

 Biography in Innovators and Pioneers, Red Gold: The Epic Story of Blood on Public Service Broadcasting website accessed June 7, 2006
 O. H. (Oswald Hope) Robertson Papers on The American Philosophical Society website accessed January 3, 2012
 

1886 births
1966 deaths
People from Woolwich
20th-century English medical doctors
University of California, Berkeley alumni
Harvard Medical School alumni
British emigrants to the United States
Blood banks
20th-century American physicians
American military personnel of World War I
United States Army Medical Corps officers
Physicians from Beijing